Ralph Vincent Guglielmi (June 26, 1933 – January 23, 2017) was an American football quarterback in the National Football League for the Washington Redskins, St. Louis Cardinals, New York Giants and the Philadelphia Eagles.  He played high school football in Columbus, Ohio at Grandview Heights High School,  college football at the University of Notre Dame and was drafted in the first round of the 1955 NFL Draft.  Guglielmi was inducted into the College Football Hall of Fame in 2001.

1933 births
2017 deaths
All-American college football players
American football quarterbacks
College football announcers
College Football Hall of Fame inductees
New York Giants players
Notre Dame Fighting Irish football players
Sportspeople from Columbus, Ohio
Philadelphia Eagles players
Players of American football from Columbus, Ohio
St. Louis Cardinals (football) players
Washington Redskins players